Murder on Lenox Avenue is a 1941 American race film directed by Arthur Dreifuss.

Plot summary 
In 1941 Harlem, New York City, someone gets framed for a murder while Pa Wilkins tries to replace the apartment building's former manager.

Cast 
Mamie Smith as Hattie
Alec Lovejoy as Flivver Johnson
Norman Astwood as Mr. Marshall
Augustus Smith as Pa Wilkins
Alberta Perkins as Mercedes
Edna Mae Harris as Singer
Sidney Easton as Speed Simmons
Dene Larry as Ola Wilkins
Ernie Ransom as Jim Bracton
Earl Sydnor as Gregory
Herman Green as Lomax
George Williams as Montoute
Cristola Williams as Rosalia
Emily Santos as Emily
Flo Lee as Flo
Wahneta San as Wahneta

Soundtrack 
Alberta Perkins - "Hot Pies" (Written by Donald Heywood)
Wahneta San - "I'm Trying to Forget You" (Written by Donald Heywood)
Mamie Smith with Sidney Easton - "I'll Get Even With You" (Written by Donald Heywood)
Wahneta San with Alec Lovejoy - "What You Know About That?" (Written by Donald Heywood)

References

External links 

1941 films
American black-and-white films
1941 drama films
American drama films
American crime films
1940s crime films
Race films
Films directed by Arthur Dreifuss
1940s English-language films
1940s American films